This is a list of series released by TVB in 2004.

Top ten drama series in ratings
The following is a list of the highest-rated drama series released by TVB in 2004. The list includes premiere week and final week ratings.

First line series
These dramas aired in Hong Kong from 8:00 to 9:00 pm, Monday to Friday on TVB.

Second line series
These dramas aired in Hong Kong from 9:00 to 9:30 pm, Monday to Friday on TVB.

Third line series
These dramas aired in Hong Kong from 10:05 to 11:05 pm (9:30 to 10:30 pm from 10 April onwards), Monday to Friday on TVB.

Weekend Dramas
These dramas aired in Hong Kong from 10:00 to 11:00 pm, Sunday on TVB.

Warehoused series
These dramas were released overseas and have not broadcast on TVB Jade Channel.

External links
TVB Official Website

2004
2004 in Hong Kong television